St. Paul University Philippines, also referred to by its acronym SPUP or SPU Philippines is a private Roman Catholic research non-profit coeducational basic and higher education institution run by the Sisters of Saint Paul of Chartres in Tuguegarao, Cagayan, Philippines. It was founded by the Paulinian Sisters on May 10, 1907. It is one of 40 schools owned, managed, and operated by the Sisters of Saint Paul of Chartres (SPC) in the Philippines. It offers basic, undergraduate, and graduate education.

History
The university was established on May 10, 1907, as the Colegio de San Pablo by six nuns from the Sisters of St. Paul of Chartres (SPC) led by Mother Ephrem Marie Fieu. The nuns came to the Cagayan Valley region upon the invitation of Bishop Dennis Joseph Dougherty. The school was initially hosted inside a Spanish convent adjacent to a cathedral. The institution changed its name to Colegio del Sagrado Corazon de Jesus in 1909 and later to Sacred Heart of Jesus Institution (SHOJI) in 1925. The school was moved from its previous location in a convent to separate grounds acquired by the SPC from the Dominican Order due to the increased number of enrollees and the expansion of its curriculum.

During the World War II Japanese occupation of the Philippines in 1941, the school complex was used as a military garrison and hospital by the Japanese. The entire campus of the school was razed when the Japanese forces garrisoned in the school were attacked by the Allied forces during the Liberation of Tugguegarao.

After the war, the school changed its name to St. Paul College of Tuguegarao (SPCT) in 1948 as part of an initiative to become the first Teacher-Training Institution in Cagayan Valley. In 1961, the SPCT began offering college education and became the first Philippine Accrediting Association of Schools, Colleges and Universities (PAASCU) accredited institution. On January 18, 1965, the entire complex was razed by a fire.

The school became the first university in Cagayan Valley in 1982. It received accreditation from more bodies and institutions such as TUV Rheinland which gave the SPUP, ISO 9001 Certification in 2000 and the Asian Association of Schools of Business International in 2014. The Catholic Bishops’ Conference of the Philippines through the Episcopal Commission on Culture (CBCP-ECC) designated the SPUP as a Catholic Center for Culture in 2012.

See also
St. Paul University Manila, Metro Manila
St. Paul University Quezon City, Metro Manila
St. Paul University at San Miguel, Bulacan
St. Paul University Dumaguete, Negros Oriental
St. Paul University Iloilo, Iloilo City
St. Paul University Surigao, Surigao del Norte

References

External links
 

Catholic universities and colleges in the Philippines
Catholic elementary schools in the Philippines
Catholic secondary schools in the Philippines
Universities and colleges in Cagayan
Education in Tuguegarao
Association of Christian Universities and Colleges in Asia
Educational institutions established in 1907
1907 establishments in the Philippines